The Wager Mutiny was the mutiny of the crew of the British war ship  after she was wrecked on a desolate island off the south coast of Chile in 1741. The ship was part of a squadron commanded by George Anson bound to attack Spanish interests in the Pacific. Wager lost contact with the squadron while rounding Cape Horn, ran aground during a storm, and wrecked on what would become known as Wager Island in May 1741. The main body of the crew mutinied against their Captain, David Cheap, abandoned him and a group of loyal crew members, and set off in a modified open boat (named Speedwell) via the Strait of Magellan to Portuguese administered Rio de Janeiro. On the Speedwell voyage most of the crew died from starvation, some were abandoned on shore, and a smaller boat with two men aboard accompanying the Speedwell disappeared in rough seas. Four hundred miles short of Rio Grande a further eight men were stranded on the shore whilst gathering food. Of this group three eventually made it back to England after being captured and enslaved by local Indians. The main ringleaders in the Speedwell that made it to Rio also returned to England.

The group abandoned on Wager Island were re-joined a few days later by a small group from the Speedwell who were sent back in the longboat to collect some sails that were left behind. Two midshipmen, Alexander Campbell and John Byron, contrived to be part of this group after they were misled into believing that the Captain would be accompanying them in Speedwell. When the longboat failed to return, the Speedwell returned to Wager Island to look for it, but by that time everybody on the island had left in an attempt to sail north and re-join the squadron.

Captain Cheap's group could not weather the cape to the north and therefore returned to Wager Island three months after they had left in a destitute condition having given up hope of escape. A few days later however a group of indigenous Chonos visited the island and after some negotiation in halting Spanish, they agreed to guide the group north along channels and the Taitao Peninsula to Spanish-inhabited Chiloé Archipelago in return for the longboat and some guns. Most of the group died on the journey from starvation and exposure, but Cheap, Campbell, Byron and a marine officer called Hamilton survived and eventually returned to England in 1745, two years after the surviving mutineers. The adventures of the crew of the Wager were a public sensation and inspired many narratives written by survivors and others to the present day.

Background and events before the wreck

HMS Wager 

HMS Wager was a square-rigged sixth-rate Royal Navy ship of 28 guns. She was built as an East Indiaman in about 1734 and made two voyages to India for the East India Company before the Royal Navy purchased her in 1739. As an Indiaman she carried 30 guns and had a crew of 98.

Under Captain Charles Raymond she sailed from the Downs on 13 February 1735, arriving in Madras on 18 July and returning to England via St Helena in July 1736. She made her second and final run for the company to India in 1738, sailing via the Cape of Good Hope to Madras and Bengal, and returning to the Downs on 27 August 1739.

The Admiralty purchased Wager from Mr J. Raymond on 21 November 1739, and rated her as a 28-gun sixth rate. The Admiralty bought her to fill in a squadron under Commodore George Anson that would attack Spanish interests on the Pacific coast of South America. Her role was to carry additional stores of small arms, ball and powder to arm shore raiding parties. It was apt that she carried the name of the principal sponsor of the voyage, Admiral Sir Charles Wager, First Lord of the Admiralty. She was fitted for naval service at Deptford Dockyard between 23 November 1739 and 23 May 1740 at a cost of £7,096.2.4d and was registered as a sixth rate on 22 April 1740, being established with 120 men and 28 guns.

Commodore Anson's squadron 

The squadron consisted of some 1,980 men (crew plus infantry), of whom only 188 survived the voyage. It included six warships and two victuallers (supply ships) in addition to Wager:

 , the flagship (a fourth-rate ship of 1,005 tons, 60 guns, and 400 men)
  (866 tons, 50 guns, 300 men)
  (683 tons, 50 guns, 300 men)
  (559 tons, 40 guns, 250 men)
  (559 tons, 24 guns, 120 men)
 Tryal (201 tons, 8 guns, 70 men)

The squadron also included 470 invalids and wounded soldiers from Chelsea hospital under the command of Lieutenant Colonel Cracherode. Most of these men were the first to die during the hardships of the voyage. Their inclusion in place of regular troops was severely criticized by historian Glyn Williams as cruel and ineffective.

Spithead to Staten Island 

The squadron took 40 days to reach Funchal where they replenished supplies of water, wood, and food before making the Atlantic crossing to Santa Catarina. Two weeks into this leg of the journey, the store ship Industry signaled to the Commodore that it required to speak to him. The Captain of Industry told Anson that his contract had been fulfilled and Industry needed to turn back for England. Her stores were distributed among the remaining ships, with a large quantity of rum sent aboard Wager. Her cargo now consisted of rum, siege guns to attack fortified Spanish holds, and trading goods for use with coastal inhabitants, to be traded for supplies for the squadron and used to subvert Spanish rule.

Many men in the squadron died of scurvy due to lack of fresh citrus fruits or meats. The high contingent of invalids in the squadron and the outbreak of scurvy meant that Anson's squadron was in poor condition for the arduous rounding of the Horn. Anson moved Captain Dandy Kidd from Wager to the Pearl and Captain Murray to Wager. Kidd died after the squadron left Santa Catarina and before they reached the straits of Staten Island. He allegedly made a deathbed prediction of success and riches for some, but death and devastating hardship for the crew of Wager.

Anson now moved Captain Murray from Wager to Pearl, and he moved Lieutenant David Cheap from the small sloop Tryal and promoted him to captain of Wager. Cheap was in command of a large vessel for the first time, crewed by sick and dispirited men. He compounded these handicaps by denigrating the technical abilities of many of the officers, and being easily moved to fits of rage. He was, however, a capable seaman and navigator, a big man who feared nobody, and a loyal and determined officer. Anson impressed on Cheap the importance of the Wager and her role in the mission, as the squadron would draw on Wager store of small arms and ammunition to attack shore bases along the west coast of Chile.

The rounding of the Horn 

The delays of the voyage were most keenly felt when the squadron rounded the Horn. The weather conditions were atrocious; high sea states and contrary winds meant that progress west was very slow. Added to this was the deteriorating health of the crew: because of scurvy, few able-bodied seamen were available to work the ship and carry out running repairs to the continually battered rigging.

After many weeks working westwards to clear the Horn, the squadron turned north when navigational reckoning suggested enough westerly had been made. At this time latitudinal determination was relatively easy with the use of a sextant; however, longitudinal determination was much harder to predict: it required accurate time-pieces or a good view of the stars on stable ground, neither of which were available to the squadron. Longitude was predicted by dead reckoning, an impossible task given the storm conditions, strong currents and length of time involved. The intention was to turn north only when Anson was reasonably certain that the Horn had been cleared.

The result was nearly a complete disaster. In the middle of the night, the moon shone through the cloud for a few minutes, revealing to diligent sentinels aboard Anna towering waves breaking onto the Patagonian coastline. Anna fired guns and set up lights to warn the other ships of the danger. Without this sighting, the whole of Anson's squadron would have been wrecked, with the likely loss of all hands. This was a severe disappointment. The ships turned around and headed south again into huge seas and a foul wind. During one particularly severe night, Wager became separated from the rest of the squadron, and would never see it again.

Events leading up to the wreck and on Wager Island

The Wrecking of the Wager 

As Wager, now alone, continued beating to the west, the question being debated was when to turn north? Do it too early and the risk of running the ship aground was very high; which the crew already realized. But, they were severely depleted with scurvy – every day more victims were going down with the condition – and there was a shortage of seamen to handle the ship. The dilemma became contentious when Captain Cheap stated his intention to make for Socorro Island (now Guamblin Island). The gunner, John Bulkley, objected strongly to this proposal. He argued to make the secondary squadron rendezvous, the Island of Juan Fernandez, their primary destination, since it was not as close to the mainland as Socorro and was less likely to result in the wrecking the ship on a lee shore. Bulkley was recognized as probably the most capable seaman on the ship; as gunner, he had officer rank. Navigation was technically the responsibility of the master, Thomas Clark, but he, along with most of the officers on board, was held in thinly-disguised contempt by Cheap.

Bulkley repeatedly tried to persuade Cheap to change his mind, arguing that the ship was in such poor condition that the crew's ability to carry the required sail-plan to beat off a lee-shore or come to anchor was compromised, making Cheap's decision to head for Socorro too hazardous, especially given that the whole area was poorly charted. In the event Bulkley was to prove exactly correct, but Cheap refused to change course. What Bulkley did not know was that Cheap was following his orders and it was impressed upon him that the siege guns in the hold of the Wager were required for attacking Valdivia. These orders were secret and the rumours that the Gunner perpetuated that Juan Fernández Islands should be their destination were not correct.

On 13 May 1741, at 9 am, John Cummins, the carpenter, went forward to inspect the chain plates. Whilst there he thought he caught a fleeting glimpse of land to the west. The lieutenant, Baynes, was also on deck but he saw nothing, and the sighting was not reported. Baynes was later reprimanded at a Court Martial for failing to alert the Captain. The sighting of land to the west was thought to be impossible. But, Wager had entered a large uncharted bay, now called Golfo de Penas, and the land to the west was later to be called the Tres Montes Peninsula.

At 2 pm land was positively sighted to the west and northwest. All hands were mustered to make sail and turn the ship to the southwest. During the frantic operations which followed, Cheap fell down the quarterdeck ladder and dislocated his shoulder and was confined below. There followed a night of terrible weather, with the ship in a disabled and worn-out condition, which severely hampered efforts to get her clear of the bay. At 4:30 am, the ship struck rocks repeatedly, broke her tiller, and although still afloat was partially flooded. The invalids below who were too sick to move were drowned.

Bulkley and another seaman, John Jones, began steering the ship with sail alone towards land, but later in the morning the ship struck again, this time fast.

Shipwrecked on Wager Island 
Wager struck rocks on the coast of a small, uninhabited island. Some of the crew broke into the spirit room and got drunk, armed themselves, and began looting, dressing up in officers' clothes and fighting, while 140 other men and officers took to the boats and made it safely to shore. Their prospects were desperate, as they were shipwrecked far into the southern latitudes at the start of winter with little food on a desolate island without resources to sustain them. The crew were dangerously divided, with many blaming the captain for their predicament. On Friday 15 May, the ship bilged amidships, and many of the drunken crew drowned. The only members of the crew left on board Wager were boatswain John King and a few of his followers, and King was a rebellious and difficult individual.

Mutiny 
The crew of Wager were frightened and angry with their captain, and dissent and insubordination grew. King fired a four-pounder cannon from Wager at the captain's hut to induce someone to collect him and his mates once they began to fear for their safety on the wreck.

The crew knew that they were in danger of harsh justice if they mutinied, so they worked to build a story to justify their actions. Full mutiny would likely not have occurred had the captain agreed to a plan of escape devised by Bulkley, who had the confidence of most men. He proposed that Cummins, the ship's carpenter, would lengthen the longboat and convert it into a schooner which could accommodate more men. They would make their way home via the Strait of Magellan to Portuguese Brazil or the British Caribbean and then home to England. The smaller barge and cutter would accompany the schooner and be important for inshore foraging work along their journey. Bulkley was skillful enough to give the plan a chance of success. Despite much prevarication, Captain Cheap would not agree to Bulkley's plan. He preferred to head north and try to catch-up with Anson's squadron.

Cheap was in a difficult predicament. He would automatically be subject to court martial, and he could be thrown out of the Navy and into a lifetime of poverty and isolation, at best. At worst, he could be found guilty of cowardice and executed by firing squad, as demonstrated by the 1757 execution of Admiral John Byng. Cheap wanted to head north along the Chilean coast to rendezvous with Anson at Valdivia. His warrant officers had warned him against some of his actions, which would reflect badly on him when the Admiralty investigated the loss of his ship.

This impasse led to the mutiny. The mutineers justified their actions based on other events, including Cheap shooting Cozens. Cheap heard an altercation outside his tent, came out in a rage, and shot Cozens in the face at point blank range without any warning. This incident further raised tensions, as Cheap refused to allow medical aid for Cozens, who took ten days to die of his wound.

The carpenter continued modifying the boats for an undetermined plan of escape, and outright mutiny remained only a possibility so long as his work continued. Once the schooner was ready, however, events happened quickly. Bulkley set the wheels in motion by drafting the following letter for the captain to sign:

Whereas upon a General Consultation, it has been agreed to go from this Place through the Streights of Magellan, for the coast of Brazil, in our way for England: We do, notwithstanding, find the People separating into Parties, which must consequently end in the Destruction of the whole Body; and as also there have been great robberies committed on the Stores and every Thing is now at a Stand; therefore, to prevent all future Frauds and Animosoties, we are unanimously agreed to proceed as above-mentioned.Pack, S (1964), p. 87–88

Baynes was presented with the letter to read, after which he said:

I cannot suppose the Captain will refuse the signing of it; but he is so self-willed, the best step we can take, is to put him under arrest for the killing of Mr. Cozens. In this case I will, with your approbation, assume command. Then our affairs will be concluded to the satisfaction of the whole company, without being any longer liable to the obstruction they now meet from the Captain's perverseness and chicanery.

Cheap refused to sign Bulkley's letter, and armed seamen entered his hut on 9 October and bound him, claiming that he was now their prisoner and they were taking him to England for trial for the murder of Cozens. Lieutenant Hamilton of the Marines was also confined, the mutineers fearing his resistance to their plan. Cheap was completely taken aback, having no real idea how far things had gone. He said to Lieutenant Baynes, "Well 'Captain' Baynes! You will doubtless be called to account for this hereafter."

Events after the Mutiny

The voyage of the Speedwell 

At noon on Tuesday, 13 October 1741, the schooner, now named the Speedwell, got under sail with the cutter and barge in company. Cheap refused to go, and to the relief of the mutineers, he agreed to be left behind with two marines who were earlier shunned for stealing food. Everyone expected Cheap to die on Wager Island, making their arrival in England much easier to explain. Bulkley assumed this by writing in his journal that day, "this was the last I ever saw of the captain". In the event, both would make it back to England alive to tell their version of events, Cheap some two years after Bulkley.

Initially the voyage got off to a bad start. After repeatedly splitting sails, the barge was sent back to Wager Island, where there were additional stores. Two midshipmen, John Byron and Alexander Campbell, who had been tricked into thinking Cheap would be taken home with them, quietly slipped aboard and formed part of the nine who returned. When Bulkley realised they were onboard he tried to get them to return but the barge set sail quickly and rounded the point of land whilst the schooner was at anchor. Once back at Wager Island, they were greeted by Captain Cheap, who was delighted to hear of their wish to remain with him. By the time Bulkley sailed back to Wager Island in search of the barge and its men, all had disappeared.

The Speedwell and the cutter turned around and sailed south. The journey was arduous and food was in very short supply. On 3 November the cutter parted company; this was serious as she was needed for inshore foraging work. By now Bulkley was despairing of the men in the Speedwell. Most were in the advanced stages of starvation, exposed in a desperately cold, open boat, and had lapsed into apathy. Some days later they had good news, sighting the cutter and rejoining it. Soon after, at night, she broke loose from her consort's tow line and was wrecked on the coast. Of the eighty-one men who had departed about two weeks before, ten had already perished.

As food began to run out, the situation became desperate. Ten men were picked out and forced to sign a paper consenting to being cast ashore on the uninhabited frozen bog-ridden southern coast of Chile, a virtual death sentence. Sixty men remained in the Speedwell. Eventually the improvised vessel entered the Strait of Magellan, in monstrous seas which threatened the boat with every wave. Men were dying from starvation regularly. Some days after exiting the Strait, the boat moved closer to land in order to take in water and hunt for food. Later, as the last of their supplies were being taken on board, Bulkley made sail, abandoning eight men on the desolate shore 300 miles south of Buenos Aires. For the second time, Bulkley would abandon men to a certain death, only to confront them back in England years into the future. Three of the party he left behind, after much exertion, made it back to England alive. Only thirty-three men remained in the Speedwell.

Eventually, and after a brief stop at a Portuguese outpost on the River Plate, where the crew were fleeced by the locals for meagre provisions and cheated by a priest who disappeared with their fowling pieces (shotguns) on the promise of returning with game, the Speedwell set sail once more. On 28 January 1742, it sighted the Rio Grande, southern Brazil, after a journey of over two thousand miles in an open boat over fifteen weeks. Of the eighty-one men who set off from Wager Island, thirty arrived at Rio in a desperate condition.

Captain Cheap's group 

Twenty men remained on Wager Island after the departure of the Speedwell. Poor weather during October and November continued. One man died of exposure after being marooned for three days on a rock for stealing food. By December and the summer solstice, it was decided to launch the barge and the yawl and skirt up the coast 300 miles to an inhabited part of Chile. During bad weather, the yawl was overturned and lost, with the quartermaster drowned.

There was not enough room for everyone in the barge, and four of the most helpless men, all marines, were left on the shore to fend for themselves.  In his account, Campbell describes events thus:
"The loss of the yawl was a great misfortune to us who belonged to her (being seven in number) all our clothes, arms, etc. being lost with her. As the barge was not capable of carrying both us and her own company, being in all seventeen men, it was determined to leave four of the Marines on this desolate place. This was a melancholy thing, but necessity compelled us to it. And as we were obliged to leave some behind us, the marines were fixed on, as not being of any service on board. What made the case of these poor men the more deplorable, was the place being destitute of seal, shellfish, or anything they could possibly live upon. The captain left them arms, ammunition, a frying pan, and several other necessaries."

Fourteen men were now left, all in the barge. After repeated failed attempts to round the headland, they decided to return to Wager Island and give up all hope of escape. The four stranded marines were looked for but had disappeared. Two months after leaving Wager Island, Captain Cheap's group returned. The thirteen survivors were close to death, and one man died of starvation shortly after arriving.

Back at Wager Island Captain Cheap was observed to deteriorate markedly in health with his legs swelling to twice their normal size, and he also attracted criticism in Byron's subsequent narrative for taking more food than the others but did less work.  Fifteen days after returning to Wager Island, the men were visited by a party of indigenous Chono nomads led by Martín Olleta, who were astonished to find castaways there. After some negotiation, with the surgeon speaking Spanish, the Chono agreed to guide Cheap's group to a small Spanish settlement up the coast, using an overland route to avoid the peninsula. The castaways traded the barge for the journey. Iron was highly valued by the Chono as this metal was even scarce in the Spanish settlements further north. Martín Olleta led the survivors through an unusual route across Presidente Ríos Lake in Taitao Peninsula avoiding the common route through San Tadeo River and San Rafael Lake.

In his book, John Byron gives a detailed account of the journey to the Spanish village of Castro in Chiloé Archipelago, as does Alexander Campbell. The ordeal took four months, during which another ten men died of starvation, exhaustion and fatigue. Marine Lieutenant Hamilton, Midshipman Campbell, Midshipman Byron, and Captain Cheap were the only survivors. Before handing over the English to Spanish authorities Martín Olleta's party stopped somewhere south of Chiloé Island to hide all iron objects, likely to avoid having them confiscated. Scholar Ximena Urbina conjectures that Martín Olleta must have lived close to the Spanish and heard from other natives of the wreckage. Thus the rescue was not by chance but an enterprise done with prior knowledge of the Spanish interest in foreigners and of the valuable loot to be found at the wreckage.

Bulkley and the Speedwell survivors return to England 

The 30 mutineers had an anxious time before eventually securing passage to Rio de Janeiro on the brigantine Saint Catherine, which set sail on Sunday 28 March 1742. Once in Rio de Janeiro, internal and external diplomatic wrangling continually threatened to terminally complicate either their lives, or at least their return to England. John King did not help. He formed a violent gang that spent most of its time repeatedly terrorising his former shipmates on various pretexts. They moved to the opposite side of Rio to avoid King. After many episodes of fleeing their accommodations in terror of King and his gang (who referred to him as their 'commander'), Bulkley, Cummins and the cooper, John Young, eventually sought protection from the Portuguese authorities.
Captain Stanley Walter Croucher Pack describes these events:
"As soon as the ruffians had gone [King's gang], the terrified occupants left their house via the back wall and fled into the country. Early the next morning they called on the consul and asked for protection. He readily understood that they were all in mortal peril from the mad designs of the boatswain [King] and placed them under protection and undertook to get them on board a ship where they could work their passage."

They eventually secured passage to Bahia in the Saint Tubes, which set sail on 20 May 1742. They gladly left the boatswain John King behind to continue causing criminal havoc in Rio de Janeiro. On 11 September 1742, the Saint Tubes left Bahia bound for Lisbon, and from there they embarked in HMS Stirling Castle on 20 December bound for Spithead, England. They arrived on New Year's Day 1743, after an absence of more than two years.

Events were also reported back to London from the British Consul in Lisbon, in a dispatch dated 1 October 1742 (see images):

"Last week four officers of the Wager which went out with Mr Anson, viz the Lieutenant of the ship [illegible, Bulkley?], two lieutenants of marines and four sailors arrived here in a Portuguese vessel; they say they were cast away upon an uninhabited island in the South Seas in May last twelvemonth, after they had lost their ship they lengthened their longboat and threw a deck over her in which & two open boats the whole crew being 81 in number resorted to put to sea, except their Captain who said it was as well to starve as be drowned which he was persuaded would be their fate [this is a lie]. One of the boats put back again immediately [the barge], the others proceeded, sailed the Straights of Magellan, kept along the coast 'till they got to Rio Grande, where they say they were well received by the Portuguese. But before they got there several of the people died in the voyage, others ran away there [meaning Isaac Morris and others, this is also a lie]. The rest sailed again from thence and went to Rio de Janeiro, what numbers landed there they do not remember. The whole event the Lieutenant [Baynes] says must be very important for [Page 2] the sailors were become masters and would not suffer him to keep a journal. When they got to the Rio de Janeiro there were lots of their companions who left them at Rio Grande had been there & were gone away in His Majesty's ship commanded by Captain Smith who sailed for the West Indies seven or eight days before they got in. The officers gone home of this Packet [HMS Stirling Castle] & the sailors are put on board His Majesty's ship the Greyhound."

Stanley Walter Croucher Pack's book describes a similar report:
"Arrival of some of the castaways from the loss of H.M.S. Wager in the South Pacific. Were well treated by Portuguese at Rio de Janeiro, but sailors were mutinous against their officers. King of Portugal has had another seizure and his departure for Caldas is postponed... etc."

Lieutenant Baynes, in order to exonerate himself, rushed ahead of Bulkley and Cummins to the Admiralty in London and gave an account of what happened to Wager which reflected badly on Bulkley and Cummins but not himself. Baynes was a weak man and an incompetent officer, as was recorded by all those who provided a narrative of these events. As a result of Baynes' report, Bulkley and Cummins were detained aboard HMS Stirling Castle for two weeks whilst the Admiralty decided how to act. It was eventually decided to release them and defer any formal court martial proceedings until the return of either Commodore Anson or Captain Cheap. When Anson did return in 1744, it was decided that no trial would proceed until Cheap returned. Bulkley asked the Admiralty for permission to publish his journal. It responded that it was his business and he could do as he liked. He released a book containing his journal, but the initial reaction from some was that he should be hanged as a mutineer.

Bulkley found employment when he assumed command of a forty-gun privateer Saphire. It was not long before Bulkley's competence and nerve found him success as he tricked his way around a superior force of French frigates which his vessel encountered when cruising. As a result, Bulkley found his successes being reported in popular London papers and gained some celebrity. He began thinking that it would not be long before the Admiralty would offer him the coveted command of a Royal Navy ship. On 9 April 1745, however, Cheap arrived back in England.

Survivors of Captain Cheap's group return to England 
By January 1742 (January 1743 in modern calendar, the year changed on 25 March in those days), as Bulkley was returning to Spithead, the four survivors of Cheap's group had spent seven months in Chacao. Nominal prisoners of the local governor, they were allowed to live with local hosts and were left unmolested. The biggest obstacle in Byron's efforts to return to England began firstly with the old lady who initially looked after him (and her two daughters) in the countryside before his move to the town itself. All of the ladies were fond of Byron and became extremely reluctant to let him leave, successfully getting the governor to agree to Byron staying with her for a few extra weeks. He finally left for Chacao, amidst many tears. Once in Chacao, Byron was also offered the hand in marriage of the richest heiress in the town. Her beau said, although "her person was good, she could not be called a regular beauty", and this seems to have sealed her fate. On 2 January 1743, the group left on a ship bound for Valparaíso. Cheap and Hamilton removed to Santiago, as they were officers who had preserved their commissions. Byron and Campbell were unceremoniously jailed.

Campbell and Byron were confined in a single cell infested with insects and placed on a starvation diet. Many locals visited their cell, paying officials for the privilege of looking at the 'terrible Englishmen', people they had heard much about, but never seen before. But, the harsh conditions moved not only their curious visitors but also the sentry at their cell door, who allowed food and money to be taken to them. Eventually Cheap's whole group made it to Santiago, where things were much better. They stayed there on parole for the rest of 1743 and 1744. Exactly why becomes clearer in Campbell's account:
"The Spaniards are very proud, and dress extremely gay; particularly the women, who spend a great deal of money upon their persons and houses. They are a good sort of people, and very courteous to strangers. Their women are also fond of gentlemen from other countries, and of other nations."

After two years, the group were offered passage on a ship to Spain; they all agreed, except Campbell. He chose to travel overland with some Spanish naval officers to Buenos Aires and from there to connect to a different ship also bound for Spain. Campbell deeply resented Captain Cheap's giving him less money in a cash allowance than he gave to Hamilton and Byron. Campbell was suspected to be edging toward marrying a Spanish colonial woman, which was against the rules of the British Navy at that time. Campbell was furious at this treatment. He wrote:
"...the misunderstanding between me and the Captain, as already related, and since which we had not conversed together, induced me not to go home in the same ship with a man who had used me so ill; but rather to embark in a Spanish man-of-war then lying at Buenos Aires."

On 20 December 1744, Cheap, Hamilton and Byron embarked on the French ship Lys, which had to return to Valparaiso after springing a leak. On 1 March 1744 (modern 1745) Lys set out for Europe, and after a good passage round the Horn, she dropped anchor in Tobago in late June 1745. After managing to get lost and sail obliviously by night through the very dangerous island chain between Grenada and St Vincent, the ship headed for Puerto Rico. The crew was alarmed at seeing abandoned barrels from British warships, as Britain was now at war with France. After narrowly avoiding being captured off San Domingo, the ship made her way to Brest, arriving on 31 October 1744. After six months in Brest being virtually abandoned with no money, shelter, food or clothing, the destitute group embarked for England on a Dutch ship. On 9 April 1745 they landed at Dover, three men of the twenty who had left in the barge with Cheap on 15 December 1741.

News of their arrival quickly spread to the Admiralty and Bulkley. Cheap went directly to the Admiralty in London with his version of events. A court martial was organised, with Bulkley being at risk of execution.

Abandoned survivors of the Speedwell group return to England 
Left by Bulkley at Freshwater Bay, in the place where today stands the resort city of Mar del Plata, were eight men who were alone, starving, sickly and in a hostile and remote country. After a month of living on sea lions killed with stones to preserve ball and powder, the group began the 300-mile trek north to Buenos Aires. Their greatest fear were the Tehuelche nomads, who were known to transit through the region. After a 60-mile trek north in two days, they were forced to return to Freshwater Bay because the lack of water resources. Once back they decided to wait for the wet season before making another attempt. They became more settled in Freshwater Bay, built a hut, tamed some puppies they took from a wild dog, and began raising pigs. One of the party spotted what they described as a 'tiger' reconnoitering their hut one night. Another sighting of a 'lion' shortly after this had the men hastily planning another attempt to walk to Buenos Aires (they actually saw a jaguar and a cougar).

One day, when most of the men were out hunting, the group returned to find the two left behind to mind the camp had been murdered, the hut torn down, and all their possessions taken. Two other men who were hunting in another area disappeared, and their dogs made their way back to the devastated camp. The four remaining men left Freshwater Bay for Buenos Aires, accompanied by 16 dogs and two pigs.

They eventually reached the mouth of the River Plate, but, unable to negotiate the marshes on the shores of Samborombon Bay, the party was forced to make their way back to Freshwater Bay. Shortly afterwards a large group of Tehuelches on horseback surrounded them, took them all prisoner, and enslaved them. After being bought and sold four times, they were eventually taken before Cangapol, a chieftain who led a loose confederation of nomad tribes dwelling between the rivers Negro and Lujan. When he learned they were English and at war with the Spanish, he treated them better. By the end of 1743, after eight months as slaves, they eventually told the chief that they wanted to return to Buenos Aires. Cangapol agreed but refused to give up John Duck, who was mulatto. An English trader in Montevideo, upon hearing of their plight, put up the ransom of $270 for the other three and they were released.

On arrival in Buenos Aires, the Spanish governor put them in jail after they refused to convert to Catholicism. In early 1745 they were moved to the ship Asia, where they were to work as prisoners of war. After this they were thrown in prison again, chained, and placed on a bread and water diet for fourteen weeks, before a judge eventually ordered their release. Then Midshipman Alexander Campbell, another of Wager crew, arrived in town.

Midshipman Alexander Campbell's overland trek to Buenos Aires 
On 20 January 1745 Alexander Campbell and four Spanish naval officers set out across South America from Valparaiso to Buenos Aires. Using mules, the party trekked into the high Andes, where they faced precipitous mountains, severe cold and, at times, serious altitude sickness. First a mule slipped on an exposed path and was dashed onto rocks far below, then two mules froze to death on a particularly horrendous night of blizzards, and an additional 20 died of thirst or starvation on the remaining journey. After seven weeks travelling, the party eventually arrived in Buenos Aires.

Campbell and the Freshwater Bay survivors return to England 
It took five months for Alexander Campbell to get out of Buenos Aires, where he was twice confined in a fort for periods of several weeks. Eventually the governor sent him to Montevideo, which was just 100 miles across the Río de la Plata. It was here that the three Freshwater Bay survivors, Midshipman Isaac Morris, Seaman Samuel Cooper and John Andrews were languishing as prisoners of war aboard the Spanish ship Asia, along with sixteen other English sailors from another ship. Campbell had finally converted to Catholicism, which helped him. While his fellow shipmates were treated harshly and confined aboard the Asia, Campbell wined and dined with various captains on the social circuit of Montevideo.

All four Wager survivors departed for Spain in the Asia at the end of October 1745, but the passage was not without incident. Having been at sea three days, eleven Indian crew on board mutinied against their barbaric treatment by the Spanish officers. They killed twenty Spaniards and wounded another twenty before briefly taking control of the ship (which had a total crew of over five hundred). Eventually the Spaniards worked to reassert control and through a 'lucky shot', according to Morris, they killed the Indian chief Orellana. His followers all jumped overboard rather than submit to Spanish retribution.

The Asia dropped anchor at the port Corcubion, near Cape Finisterre on 20 January 1746. The authorities chained together Morris, Cooper and Andrews and put them in jail. Campbell went to Madrid for questioning. After four months held captive in awful conditions, the three Freshwater Bay survivors were eventually released to Portugal, from where they sailed for England, arriving in London on 5 July 1746. Bulkley had to confront men he assumed had died on a desolated coastline thousands of miles away.

Campbell's insistence that he had not entered the service of the Spanish Navy, as Cheap and Byron had believed, was apparently confirmed when he arrived in London during early May 1746, shortly after Cheap. Campbell went straight to the Admiralty, where he was promptly dismissed from the service for his change in religion. His hatred for Cheap had, if anything, intensified. After all he had been through, he completes his account of this incredible story thus:

"Most of the hardships I suffered in following the fortunes of Captain Cheap were the consequence of my voluntary attachment to that gentleman. In reward for this the Captain has approved himself the greatest Enemy I have in the world. His ungenerous Usage of me forced me to quit his Company, and embark for Europe in a Spanish ship rather than a French one."

Court martial into the loss of Wager 
Proceedings for a full court martial to inquire into the loss of Wager were initiated once Cheap had returned and made his report to the Admiralty. All Wager survivors were ordered to report aboard HMS Prince George at Spithead for the court martial. Bulkley on hearing this reacted in his typical style of being overly clever and devious. He arranged to dine with the Deputy Marshal of the Admiralty (the enforcing officer of the Royal Navy command) but kept his true identity concealed.

Bulkley wrote about his prepared conversation with the Deputy Marshal at the Paul's Head Tavern in Cateaton Street:
"Desiring to know his opinion in regard to the Officers of the Wager, as their Captain was come home; for that I had a near relation which was an Officer that came in the long-boat from Brazil, and it would give me concern if he would suffer: His answer was that he believ'd that we should be hang'd. To which I replied, for God's Sake for what, for not being drown'd? And is a Murderer at last come home to their Accuser? I have carefully perused the Journal, and can't conceive that they have been guilty of Piracy, Mutiny, nor any Thing else to deserve it. It looks to me as if their Adversaries have taken up arms against the Power of the Almighty, for delivering them."

At which point the Marshal responded:
"Sir, they have been guilty of such things to Captain Cheap whilst a Prisoner, that I believe the Gunner and Carpenter will be hang'd if no Body else."

Bulkley told the Marshal of his true identity, who immediately arrested him. Upon arrival aboard Prince George, Bulkley sent some of his friends to visit Cheap to gauge his mood and intentions. Their report gave Bulkley little comfort. Cheap was in a vindictive frame of mind, telling them:
Gentlemen, I have nothing to say for nor against Villains, until the Day of Tryal, and then it is not in my Power to be off from hanging them."

Upon securing the main players, trial was set for Tuesday 15 April 1746, presided by Vice Admiral of the Red Squadron James Steuart. Much of what happened on the day land was first sighted off Patagonia as recounted here came out in sworn testimonies, with statements from Cheap, Byron, Hamilton, Bulkley, Cummins and King (who had also returned to England, under unknown circumstances) and a number of other crew members.

Cheap, although keen to charge those who abandoned him in the Speedwell with mutiny, decided not to make any accusations when it was suggested to him that any such claims would lead to his being accused of murdering Midshipman Cozens. None of the witnesses was aware at this point that the Admiralty had decided not to examine events after the ship foundered as part of the scope of the court martial proceedings.

After testimony and questioning, the men were all were promptly acquitted of any wrongdoing, except for Lieutenant Baynes. He was admonished for not reporting the carpenter's sighting of land to the west to the captain, or letting go the anchor when ordered.

 Aftermath 
The mutineers argued that, since their pay stopped on the day their vessel was wrecked, they were no longer under naval law. Captain Stanley Walter Croucher Pack, in his book about the mutiny, describes this and the Admiralty's decision not to investigate events after the Wager was lost in more detail:

"Their Lordships knew that a conviction of mutiny would be unpopular with the country. Things were bad with the Navy in April 1746. Their Lordships were out of favour. One of the reasons for this was their harsh treatment of Admiral Vernon, a popular figure with the public... The defence that the Mutineers had was that as their wages automatically stopped when the ship was lost, they were no longer under naval law. Existence of such a misconception could lead, in time of enemy action or other hazard, to anticipation that the ship was already lost. Anson realised the danger and corrected this misconception. As Lord Commissioner he removed any further doubt in 1747. An Act was passed "for extending the discipline of the Navy to crews of his majesty's ships, wrecked lost or taken, and continuing to receive wages upon certain conditions... The survivors of the Wager were extremely lucky not to be convicted of mutiny and owe their acquittal not only to the unpopularity of the Board, but to the strength of public opinion, to the fact that their miraculous escapes had captured the public fancy."

Captain Cheap was promoted to the distinguished rank of post captain and appointed to command the forty-gun ship , demonstrating that the Admiralty considered his many faults secondary to his steadfast loyalty and sense of purpose. He captured a valuable prize soon after, which allowed him to marry in 1748. He died in 1752. His service records, reports, will and death are recorded in the National Archives.Admiralty Archive: Will of Captain David Cheap PROB 11/797

Midshipman John Byron was promoted to the rank of master and commander, and appointed to command the twenty-gun ship Syren. He eventually rose to the rank of vice admiral. Byron had a varied and significant active service history which included a circumnavigation of the globe. He married in 1748 and raised a family. His grandson George Gordon Byron became a famous poet. He died in 1786.

Robert Baynes' service records exist from prior to the sailing of Anson's squadron. Upon his return to England after the Wager affair, he never served at sea again. Instead, in February 1745, before the court martial, he was given a position onshore running a naval store yard in Clay near the Sea, Norfolk. Apart from some reports of thieving from his yard, his life did not create other records. He remained in this capacity until his death in 1758.Robert Baynes, death recorded by Admiralty ADM 354/160/116

Shortly after the court martial, John Bulkley was offered command of the cutter Royal George, which he declined, thinking her "too small to keep to the sea". He was right in his assessment, as the vessel subsequently foundered in the Bay of Biscay, with the loss of all hands.Pack, S (1964), p.244

Alexander Campbell completes his narrative of the Wager affair by denying he had entered the service of the Spanish Navy; however, in the same year his book was published, a report was made against him.

Further reading
 John Bulkeley & John Cummins: A Voyage to the South-Seas, in the Years 1740-1: Containing a Faithful Narrative of the Loss of His Majesty's Ship the Wager on a Desolate Island. Cambridge University Press, Cambridge 2015. 
 James Burney: A Chronological History of the Voyages and Discoveries in the South Sea or Pacific Ocean. Forgotten Books, London 2016. 
 John Byron: Byron's Narrative of the Loss of the Wager. Forgotten Books, London 2016. 
 Isaac Morris. A narrative of the dangers and distresses which befel Isaac Morris, and seven more of the crew, belonging to The Wager store-ship. Gale, Andover 2010. 
 Alexander Campbell: The sequel to Bulkeley and Cummins's Voyage to the South-Seas. Gale, Andover 2012. 
 Lt. Col. Hon. Arthur C. Murray: An Episode in the Spanish War 1739-1744. Seeley, London 1952
 Captain Stanley Walter Croucher Pack, CBE: The Wager Mutiny. Alvin Redman, London 1952.
 Richard Walther: Anson's Voyage Around the World: In the Years, 1740-1744. The Narrative Press, London 2001, 
 Glyn Williams: The Prize of All the Oceans: Anson's Voyage Around the World. Penguin Books, New York 2000. 
 Rear Admiral C.H. Layman: The Wager Disaster: Mayhem, Mutiny and Murder in the South Seas. Unicorn Press, London 2015. 

 References 

 Bibliography 
 Bulkeley, John; Cummins, John. A Voyage to the South-Seas in the Years 1740-1. London: Jacob Robinson, 1743. Second edition, with additions, London (1757)
 Bulkeley, John; Cummins, John; Byron, John; Gurney, Alan. The Loss of the Wager: The Narratives of John Bulkeley and the Hon. John Byron, Boydell Press (2004). 
 Byron, John. Narrative of the Hon. John Byron; Being an Account of the Shipwreck of The Wager; and the Subsequent Adventures of Her Crew, 1768. Second edition, 1785.
 Byron, John; Morris, Isaac. The Wreck of The Wager and subsequent Adventures of her Crew, Narritives of The Hon. John Byron and his fellow midshipman Isaac Morris. 1913. Blackie & Son Ltd., London.
 Campbell, Alexander. The sequel to Bulkeley and Cummins's voyage to the South-seas. London, W. Owen (1747)
 
 Morris, Isaac. A Narrative of the Dangers and Distresses Which Befel Isaac Morris, and Seven More of the Crew, Belonging to the Wager Store-Ship, Which Attended Commodore Anson, in His Voyage to the South Sea: Containing an Account of Their Adventures. London: S. Birt, 1752.
 
  Vignati, Milcíades Alejo: Viajeros, obras y documentos para el estudio del hombre americano: Obras y documentos para el estudio del hombre americano. Editorial Coni, Buenos Aires, 1956, p. 86
 Walter, Richard (1749), A voyage round the world, in the years 1740-44 (5th Edition). John and Paul Knapdon, London
 Williams, Glyn (1999). The Prize of All the Oceans''. Viking, New York. 

Maritime incidents in 1741
Royal Navy mutinies
1741 in the Captaincy General of Chile
Maritime incidents in Chile
Maritime incidents in Argentina
History of Aysén Region
18th-century history of the Royal Navy
Castaways